Intres may refer to:
Intres, Ardèche, town in France
Intres B.V., Dutch retail organisation